Phyllostachys fimbriligula  is a species of bamboo found in Hunan, Jiangsu, Jiangxi, Zhejiang provinces of China.

References

External links
 
 

fimbriligula
Flora of China